Nickolas Charles Borelli (March 5, 1905 – December 12, 1992) was an American professional football player who spent one season in the National Football League with the Newark Tornadoes in 1930, appearing in 10 games, making six starts.

Borelli was born in Cliffside Park, New Jersey, where he attended Cliffside Park High School.

References

1905 births
1992 deaths
Cliffside Park High School alumni
Muhlenberg College alumni
Newark Tornadoes players
People from Cliffside Park, New Jersey
Players of American football from New Jersey
Sportspeople from Bergen County, New Jersey